Oral and maxillofacial surgery is a surgical specialty focusing on reconstructive surgery of the face, facial trauma surgery, the oral cavity, head and neck, mouth, and jaws, as well as facial cosmetic surgery/facial plastic surgery including cleft lip and cleft palate surgery.

Specialty 
An oral and maxillofacial surgeon is a regional specialist surgeon who treats the entire craniomaxillofacial complex: anatomical area of the mouth, jaws, face, and skull, head and neck as well as associated structures. Depending upon the national jurisdiction, oral and maxillofacial surgery may require a degree in medicine, dentistry or both.

Subspecialties 
In the U.S., oral and maxillofacial surgeons, whether possessing a single or dual degree, may further specialize after residency, undergoing additional one or two year sub-specialty oral and maxillofacial surgery fellowship training in the following areas:

Cosmetic facial surgery, including eyelid (blepharoplasty), nose (rhinoplasty), facial lift, brow lift, and laser resurfacing
 Cranio-maxillofacial trauma, including zygomatic (cheek bone), orbital (eye socket), mandibular and nasal fractures as well as facial soft tissue lacerations and penetrating neck injuries
Craniofacial surgery/pediatric maxillofacial surgery, including cleft lip and palate surgery and trans-cranial craniofacial surgery including Fronto-Orbital Advancement and Remodelling (FOAR) and total vault remodelling
Head and neck cancer and microvascular reconstruction free flap surgery
 Maxillofacial regeneration, which is re-formation of the facial region by advanced stem cell technique

United Kingdom and Europe
In countries such as the UK and most of Europe, it is recognised as a specialty of medicine with a degree in medicine and an additional degree in dentistry being compulsory. The scope of practice is mainly head and neck cancer, microvascular reconstruction, craniofacial surgery and cranio-maxillofacial trauma, skin cancer, facial deformity, cleft lip and palate, craniofacial surgery, TMJ surgery and cosmetic facial surgery.

In the UK, Maxillofacial surgery is a specialty of the Royal College of Surgeons of England, Royal College of Surgeons of Edinburgh. Intercollegiate Board Certification is provided through the JCIE, and is the same as Plastic Surgery, ENT, General Surgery, Orthopaedics, Paediatric Surgery, Neurosurgery and Cardiothoracic Surgery.

The FRCS (Fellowship of the Royal College of Surgeons) is the specialist exam at the end of surgical training, and is required to work as a Consultant Surgeon in Maxillofacial Surgery.

Canada, Asia, and Scandinavia 
In Canada, Asia, and Scandinavia (Sweden, Finland, Denmark, Norway) oral and maxillofacial surgery is also recognized as a dental specialty and requires a degree in dentistry prior to surgical residency training. The Canadian model is the same as the model used in the United States of America.

India
In countries such as India, oral and maxillofacial surgery, popularly known as OMFS is a branch recognized by DCI (Dental Council of India). An initial degree of dentistry for 5 years followed by an additional three years of specialisation post-graduation is mandatory to become a maxillofacial surgeon in India. The scope of oral and maxillofacial Surgery in India includes practice of head and neck cancer, facial cosmetic surgery, microvascular surgery, cranio-maxillofacial trauma and cleft and cranio-maxillofacial surgery.

Australia and New Zealand 
In Australia and New Zealand Oral and Maxillofacial Surgery is recognised as both a specialty of medicine and dentistry. Degrees in both medicine and dentistry are compulsory prior to being accepted for surgical training. The scope of practice is broad and there is the ability to undertake subspecialty fellowships in areas such as head and neck surgery and microvascular reconstruction.

Globally
In other countries, oral and maxillofacial surgery as a specialty exists but under different forms, as the work is sometimes performed by a single or dual qualified specialist depending on each country's regulations and training opportunities available. In several countries oral and maxillofacial surgery is a specialty recognized by a professional association, as is the case with the Dental Council of India, American Dental Association, Royal College of Surgeons of England, Royal College of Surgeons of Edinburgh, Royal College of Dentists of Canada, Royal Australasian College of Surgeons and Brazilian Federal Council of Odontology (CFO).

Regulation 
Oral and Maxillofacial surgery is an internationally recognized surgical specialty. Oral and maxillofacial surgery is formally designated as either a medical, dental or dual (medical and dental) specialty.

United States of America
In the United States, oral and maxillofacial surgery is a recognized surgical specialty, formally designated as a dental specialty. A professional dental degree is required, a qualification in medicine may be undertaken optionally during residency training. In this respect, oral and maxillofacial surgery is sui generis among surgical specialties. Oral and maxillofacial surgery requires an extensive 4-6 year surgical residency training covering the U.S. specialty's scope of practice: surgery of the oral cavity, dental implant surgery, dentoalveolar surgery, surgery of the temporomandibular joint, general surgery, reconstructive surgery of the face, head and neck, mouth, and jaws, facial cosmetic surgery, facial deformity, craniofacial surgery, facial skin cancer, head and neck cancer, microsurgery free flap reconstruction, facial trauma, facial trauma surgery and, uniquely, the administration of general anesthesia and deep sedation. As is the norm among surgical specialists, oral and maxillofacial surgery residents typically serve as Chief Resident in their final year.

Following residency training, oral and maxillofacial surgeons, whether single or dual degree, have the option of undergoing 1-2 year surgical sub-specialty fellowship for further training in head and neck cancer, microvascular reconstruction, cosmetic facial surgery, craniofacial surgery and cranio-maxillofacial trauma.

Board certification 
Board certification in the U.S. is governed by the American Board of Oral and Maxillofacial Surgery (ABOMS). Oral and maxillofacial surgery is among the fourteen surgical specialties recognized by the American College of Surgeons. Oral and maxillofacial surgeons in the United States, whether single or dual degree, may become Fellows of the American College of Surgeons, "FACS" (Fellow, American College of Surgeons).

Professional organizations 
The American Association of Oral and Maxillofacial Surgeons (AAOMS) is the chief professional organization representing the roughly 9,000 oral and maxillofacial surgeons in the United States. The American Association of Oral and Maxillofacial Surgeons publishes the peer reviewed Journal of Oral and Maxillofacial Surgery.

The American College of Oral and Maxillofacial Surgeons (ACOMS) is a voluntary professional organization of oral and maxillofacial surgeons, including residents. The mission of ACOMS is to enhance surgical excellence through life-long education and to promote fellowship amongst oral and maxillofacial surgeons.

Anesthesia 
In the U.S., oral and maxillofacial surgeons are required to undergo five months of intensive general anesthesia training. An additional month of pediatric anesthesia training is also required. The American Society of Anesthesiologists published a Statement on the Anesthesia Care Team which specifies qualified anesthesia personnel and practitioners as anesthesiologists, anesthesiology fellows, anesthesiology residents, and oral and maxillofacial surgery residents.

Unique among surgical specialists in the U.S., oral and maxillofacial surgeons are trained to administer general anesthesia and deep sedation are licensed to do so in both hospital and office settings.

In the specialty's infancy, dental and oral surgeons were plenary in the introduction of anesthesia to modern medicine and the development of modern surgery. In 1844, at Harvard Medical School's Massachusetts General Hospital, dentist, Dr. Horace Wells was the first to use anesthesia, but with limited success. On 16 October 1846, Boston oral surgeon, Dr. William Thomas Green Morton gave a successful demonstration using diethyl ether to Harvard medical students at the same venue. In one of the most important and well documented events in American medical history, Morton was invited to Massachusetts General Hospital to demonstrate his technique for painless surgery. After Morton had induced anesthesia, Dr. John Collins Warren, a founding member of Massachusetts General Hospital, the hospital's first surgeon, and the first Dean of Harvard Medical School, removed a tumor from the neck of patient, Edward Gilbert Abbott. The demonstration was performed in the surgical amphitheater now called the Ether Dome at Harvard. Massachusetts General Hospital views the demonstration as among the institution's most significant claims to fame. Upon the successful completion of Dr. Morton's demonstration, Dr. Warren famously proclaimed to the crowded, astonished and elated amphitheater, what would become likely the most famous words in modern medicine, "Gentlemen, this is no humbug." Indeed, the event marked the beginning of modern anesthesia and surgical practice.

Immediately following the demonstration, in a congratulatory letter to Dr. William Thomas Green Morton, polymath and later Harvard Medical School Dean, Oliver Wendell Holmes Sr., father of Justice Oliver Wendell Holmes Jr. of the Supreme Court of the United States, proposed naming the state produced "anesthesia", and the procedure an "anesthetic." Holmes wrote to Morton, "Everybody wants to have a hand in a great discovery. All I will do is to give a hint or two as to names—or the name—to be applied to the state produced and the agent. The state should, I think, be called 'Anaesthesia.' This signifies insensibility—more particularly ... to objects of touch." Holmes added poetically that the new term "will be repeated by the tongues of every civilized [member] of mankind."

Dr. Ferdinand Hasbrouck, a New York oral surgeon and an 1870 graduate of the University of Pennsylvania School of Dental Medicine was among the first practitioners to succeed in the regular and commercial use of anesthesia in private surgical practice. In 1893, U.S. President Grover Cleveland was diagnosed with an intraoral tumor. The President chose Dr. Hasbrouck to serve among his team of surgeons and simultaneously as the anesthesiologist for the procedure. For political reasons, Cleveland did not want the public to know about his condition. The operation was performed in secret on the yacht Oneida in the Long Island Sound, NY. Dr. Hasbrouck, induced President Cleveland with nitrous oxide and extracted teeth from the corpus of the tumor. As Cleveland recovered from nitrous oxide, Dr. Hasbrouck began the administration of ether for the remainder of the procedure as he and the team performed the tumor surgery. The procedure was a milestone for the practice of anesthesia. Ferdinand Hasbrouck's son, James F. Hasbrouck, discussed below, was among the founders of the Columbia University College of Dental and Oral Surgeons in 1916.

In 1945, oral and maxillofacial surgeon, Dr. Niels Jorgensen was first to develop intravenous moderate sedation. His technique, administering pentobarbital, meperidine and scopolamine intravenously, was widely accepted and first taught at Loma Linda University School of Medicine, beginning in 1945.

In the United States, a close educational and professional relationship between oral and maxillofacial surgery and anesthesiology persists to the present day.

Craniofacial surgery 
Oral and maxillofacial surgery stands as a pillar of the modern practice of plastic surgery and plastic surgery's recognition in 1941 as a surgical specialty in the United States. In the early 1900s, plastic surgery was founded by a professional organization of oral surgeons with elite training and an interest in plastic and reconstructive surgery, the American Association of Oral and Plastic Surgery. Over time, the exclusive organization began to elect a small number of non-oral surgeon members, the first of which was legendary general surgeon Dr. Vilray Blair of Washington University in St. Louis. The organization became the American Association of Plastic Surgeons in 1921. At Harvard University, oral and maxillofacial surgeon, Dr. Varaztad Kazanjian pioneered plastic surgery and is considered to be a founder, if not, the founder of the modern practice of plastic surgery. He graduated from Harvard School of Dental Medicine in 1905. Dr. Kazanjian was Professor of Clinical Oral Surgery at Harvard from 1922 to 1941 when he was named Harvard's first Professor of Plastic Surgery. Dr. Kazanjian was instrumental in plastic surgery's formal recognition as an independent surgical specialty in 1941. Dr. Kazanjian joined the First Harvard Unit, serving with the British Forces in WWI, establishing the first dental and maxillofacial clinic in France, handling more than 3,000 cases of severe wounds to the face and jaws. He was honored for his surgical advances by British monarch George V, who invested him Companion to the Order of St Michael and St George. Kazanjian served as an early president of American Association of Plastic Surgeons.

Another founder and god-father of plastic surgery was University of Pennsylvania oral surgeon, Dr. Robert H. Ivy, an 1898 University of Pennsylvania School of Dental Medicine graduate, developed the surgical treatment of cleft lip and cleft palate. The inter-maxillary fixation technique, the Ivy Loop is named after him. Ivy is considered a pioneer and father of the modern practice of plastic surgery. Ivy was influenced by Dr. Vilray Blair of Washington University in St. Louis School of Medicine. Ivy founded the Journal of Plastic and Reconstructive Surgery, plastic surgery's premier peer reviewed academic journal and the American Association of Oral and Plastic Surgeons and served as its president. In 1919, New York City oral and maxillofacial surgeon, Dr. Armin Wald, an 1896 graduate of New York University College of Dentistry, was among the first in the United States to successfully demonstrate and publish a procedure for alveolectomy and alveoloplasty, the surgical resection and smoothing of the ridge of the mandible and maxilla for cosmetic and prosthetic purposes. Once mastered, the innovative procedure was remarkably simple; to the present, the procedure is commonplace among oral, plastic and ENT surgeons performing alveolar ridge reconstruction and bone grafting. Wald was influenced by his father, Henry Wald, M.D., an 1872 University of Vienna Faculty of Medicine graduate and preceptor in surgery at Columbia College School of Medicine; their nephew, Charles A. Reich, became a law professor at Yale. Wald's partner, New York University oral and maxillofacial surgeon, Dr. James F. Hasbrouck, interested in the development of the surgical specialty in New York, was among the founders of the Columbia University College of Dental and Oral Surgery in 1916. In keeping with the ideals of the American Association of Oral and Plastic Surgeons, the first two years of coursework at the new college were fully unified with Columbia's College of Physicians and Surgeons, of which Hasbrouck was an 1894 graduate. Students devoted their entire second two years to specialization in surgery at Columbia Presbyterian Hospital, which provided extraordinary preparation for the possibility of post-graduate residency training in oral surgery. Hasbrouck was notable in the specialty for having received both a dental and medical degree prior to 1895. His father, oral surgeon, Ferdinand Hasbrouck, discussed above, was a pioneer in anesthesiology. Hasbrouck's and Wald's sons, Theodore F. Hasbrouck and Arthur H. Wald both graduated from Columbia's College of Dental and Oral Surgery in 1937. Arthur Wald made further advances in grafting in oral, plastic and reconstructive surgery with the early use of fibrin foam and thrombin in the resection of large and rare mandibular tumors. He served in the United States Army Air Forces during World War II and owned a cosmetic practice in midtown Manhattan. Globally, the role of oral and maxillofacial surgery was also profound in the founding of plastic surgery: outside the United States, fathers of plastic surgery include London based otolaryngologist Sir Harold Gillies and his French mentor, the renowned oral and maxillofacial surgeon, Dr. Hippolyte Morestin.

Oral and maxillofacial surgery's stature and clout in university hospitals can be traced to its plenary role in the development of modern medicine and surgery.

State licensure 
While a professional dental degree, i.e., D.D.S. or D.M.D. is mandatory in the U.S., oral and maxillofacial surgeons may possess various doctoral degree combinations, e.g., D.D.S., D.M.D., D.D.S./M.D., D.M.D./M.D., D.M.D./Ph.D. or D.D.S./Ph.D. Still, it is the completion of an oral and maxillofacial residency training program and corresponding certificate of specialty training that confers surgical specialty status and board eligibility, not the surgeon's professional degree or degree combination. Analogously, it is a certificate of specialty training and board eligibility that satisfies state licensure requirements to administer general anesthesia and deep sedation, not the surgeon's professional degree or degree combination.

D.D.S. (Doctor of Dental Surgery) and D.M.D. (Doctor of Medicine in Dentistry or Doctor of Dental Medicine) are the same degrees. D.M.D. and D.D.S. represent the same education. The letters used are a function of university discretion, both degrees represent an identical curriculum, set of educational requirements and level of educational attainment.

Health Insurance Portability and Accountability Act taxonomy 
Oral and maxillofacial surgery is assigned Health Care Provider Taxonomy Code: 204E00000X

Surgical procedures 
In the United States and globally, treatments may be performed on the craniomaxillofacial complex: mouth, jaws, face, neck, and skull, and include:

 Cosmetic surgery of the head and neck: (rhytidectomy/facelift, browlift, blepharoplasty/Asian blepharoplasty, otoplasty, rhinoplasty, septoplasty, cheek augmentation, chin augmentation, genioplasty, oculoplastics, neck liposuction, hair transplantation, lip enhancement, injectable cosmetic treatments like botox, fillers, platelet rich plasma, stem cells, chemical peel, mesotherapy.
 Orthognathic surgery, surgical treatment/correction of dentofacial deformity as well as management of facial trauma, and sleep apnea
 Oncology head and neck surgery with free flap microvascular reconstruction
 Cutanous malignancy/skin cancer surgery of head and neck surgery skin grafts and local flaps
 Diagnosis and treatment of:
 benign pathology (cysts, tumors etc.)
 malignant pathology (oral & head and neck cancer) with (ablative and reconstructive surgery, microsurgery)
 cutaneous malignancy (skin cancer), lip reconstruction
 congenital craniofacial malformations such as cleft lip and palate and cranial vault malformations such as craniosynostosis, (craniofacial surgery)
 chronic facial pain disorders
 temporomandibular joint (TMJ) disorders
 Orthognathic (literally "straight bite") reconstructive surgery, orthognathic surgery, maxillomandibular advancement, surgical correction of facial asymmetry.
 soft and hard tissue trauma of the oral and maxillofacial region (jaw fractures, cheek bone fractures, nasal fractures, LeFort fracture, skull fractures and eye socket fractures).
 Dentoalveolar surgery (surgery to remove impacted teeth, difficult tooth extractions, extractions on medically compromised patients, bone grafting or preprosthetic surgery to provide better anatomy for the placement of implants, dentures, or other dental prostheses)
 Surgery to insert osseointegrated (bone fused) dental implants and maxillofacial implants for attaching craniofacial prostheses and bone anchored hearing aids.

Occupation 
Oral and maxillofacial surgery is intellectually and physically demanding and is among the most highly compensated surgical specialties in the United States with a 2008 average annual income of $568,968.

The popularity of oral and maxillofacial surgery as a career for persons whose first degree was medicine, not dentistry, seems to be increasing. At least one program exists that allows highly qualified candidates whose first degree is in medicine, to earn the required dental degree, so as to qualify for entrance into oral and maxillofacial residency training programs and ultimately achieve board eligibility and certification in the surgical specialty.

Education and training
In the UK, Oral and maxillofacial surgery is one of the ten medical specialties, requiring MRCS and FRCS examinations.

In mainland Europe, its status, including whether or not oral surgery, maxillofacial surgery and stomatology are considered separate specialties, varies by country. The required qualifications (medical degree, dental degree, or both, as well as the required internship and residency programs) also vary.

In the US, Australia and South Africa, Oral and maxillofacial surgery is one of the ten dental specialties recognized by the American Dental Association, Royal College of Dentists of Canada, and the Royal Australasian College of Dental Surgeons. Oral and maxillofacial surgery requires four to six years of further formal university training after dental school (i.e., DDS, BDent, DMD or BDS).

Residency training programs are either four or six years in duration. In the United States, four-year residency programs grant a certificate of specialty training in oral and maxillofacial surgery. Six year programs granting an optional MD degree emerged in the early 1990s in the United States. Typically, Six-year residency programs grant the specialty certificate and an additional degree such as a medical degree (e.g., MD, MBBS, MBChB) or research degree (e.g., MS, MSc, MPhil, MDS, MSD, MDSc, DClinDent, DSc, DMSc, PhD). Both four– and six–year graduates are designated US "Board Eligible" and those who earn "Board Certification" are Diplomats. Approximately 50% of the training programs in the US and 66% of Canadian training programs are "dual-degree." The typical total length of education and training, post-secondary school is 12 to 14 years. Beyond these years, some sub-specialize, adding an additional 1-2 year fellowship.

The typical training program for an oral and maxillofacial surgeon is:

 2–4 years undergraduate study (BS, BA, or equivalent degrees)
 4 years dental study (DMD, BDent, DDS or BDS)
 4–6 years residency trainingSome programs integrate an additional degree such as: a master's degree (MS, MDS, MSc, MClinDent, MScDent, MDent), doctoral degree (PhD, DMSc, DClinDent, DSc), or medical degree (MBBS, MD, DO, MBChB, MDCM)
 After completion of surgical training most undertake final specialty examinations: US: "Board Certified (ABOMS)", Australia/NZ: FRACDS, or Canada: "FRCDC"
 Some colleges offer membership or fellowships in oral/maxillofacial surgery: MOralSurg RCS, M(OMS) RCPS, FFD RCSI, FEBOS, FACOMS, FFD RCS, FAMS, FCDSHK, FCMFOS (SA)
 Both single and dual qualified oral and maxillofacial surgeons may obtain fellowship with the American College of Surgeons (FACS).

Surgical sub-specialty fellowship training
In addition, single and dual qualified graduates of oral and maxillofacial surgery training programs can pursue post-residency sub-specialty fellowships, typically 1–2 years in length, in the following areas:

 Head and neck cancermicrovascular reconstruction
 Cosmetic facial surgery (facelift, rhinoplasty, etc.)
 Craniofacial surgery and pediatric maxillofacial surgery (cleft lip and palate repair, surgery for craniosynostosis, etc.)
 Cranio-maxillofacial trauma (soft tissue and skeletal injuries to the face, head and neck)

Charities 
A number of notable philanthropic organizations provide humanitarian oral and maxillofacial surgery around the globe. Smile Train was created in 1998 by Charles Wang focusing on childhood facial deformity. Operation Smile focuses on correcting cleft lips and palates in children. AboutFace, created by Paul Stanley, of the rock band KISS, who was born with a facial deformity, focuses on craniofacial disfiguration.

See also

References

External links 
 International Association of Oral and Maxillofacial Surgeons
 British Association of Oral and Maxillofacial Surgeons
 American College of Surgeons
 American Association of Oral and Maxillofacial Surgeons
 American Board of Oral and Maxillofacial Surgeons
 Journal of Oral and Maxillofacial Surgery

 
Surgical specialties
Medical specialties